Dick Ringler is an emeritus Professor of English and Scandinavian Studies at the University of Wisconsin - Madison, and is one of the world's foremost authorities on Icelandic literature.

Ringler's book Bard of Iceland: Jónas Hallgrimsson: Poet and Scientist, a biography and translation of selected works of Icelandic poet Jónas Hallgrimsson was named a top ten University Press title for 2003 by Book Sense. In 2007 he completed a new translation of the Old English epic poem Beowulf, in which particular emphasis was given to preserving the oral rhythm and meter of the original text. This translation was adapted as an audio drama with Norman Gilliland of Wisconsin Public Radio and was released in 2007 under the title Beowulf: The Complete Story—A Drama.

References

American academics of English literature
Year of birth missing (living people)
Living people
University of Wisconsin–Madison faculty